Wilhelms is a surname. Notable people with the surname include:
 (1889–1953), Finnish artist
Don Wilhelms (born 1930), American geologist, namesake of minor planet 4826 Wilhelms 
Einar Wilhelms (1895–1978), Norwegian footballer
 (1918–2010), Finnish theologian
Gary Wilhelms (born 1938), American politician
Jane Wilhelms (died 2005), American biologist and computer scientist
Jenny Wilhelms (born 1974), Finnish musician
, German cinematographer
Ralf Wilhelms (born 1962), German footballer
Thorsten Wilhelms (born 1969), German cyclist